The Fellowship of the British Academy consists of world-leading scholars and researchers in the humanities and social sciences. A varying number of fellows are elected each year in July at the Academy's annual general meeting. The first woman was elected to the fellowship in 1932.

Elected in 1930s

Elected in 1940s

Elected in 1950s

Elected in 1960s

Elected in 1970s

Elected in 1980s

Elected in 1990s

Elected in 2000s

Elected in 2010s

Elected in 2020s

References

 
Women scholars and academics